The Oregon Trail Arboretum is an arboretum east of the Echo School Athletic Field in Echo, Oregon. It was established in 1993, and now contains over 130 ornamental trees and shrubs.

See also 
 List of botanical gardens in the United States

External links
Image from the Oregon Trail Arboretum
Guide to Community Arboretums in Oregon

Arboreta in Oregon
Protected areas of Umatilla County, Oregon
1993 establishments in Oregon
Echo, Oregon